"Spirit Dreams Inside -Another Dream-" is the twenty-second single by L'Arc-en-Ciel, released on September 5, 2001. It was their first single of the 21st century and their last single until "Ready Steady Go" in 2004. The song debuted at number 1 on the Oricon chart and sold over 201,000 copies in its initial week.

The single contains an English language b-side, "Spirit Dreams Inside", which was played during the credits of the film Final Fantasy: The Spirits Within. As well as appearing on the film's soundtrack, Spirit Dreams Inside was also featured on L'Arc-en-Ciel's 2004 album Smile.

Track listing

Personnel
 Hyde – vocals, acoustic guitar
 Ken – guitar, backing vocals, keyboards, lap steel guitar
 Tetsu – bass guitar, backing vocals
 Yukihiro – drums, percussion, backing vocals
 Hajime Okano – keyboards
 Hiroaki Sugawara – synthesizer
 Hal-Oh Togashi – acoustic piano

References

2001 singles
L'Arc-en-Ciel songs
Oricon Weekly number-one singles
Songs written by Hyde (musician)
2001 songs
Ki/oon Music singles
Japanese film songs
Songs written for animated films